= Mahtol'at Pessian =

Iranian novelist

- ماه‌طلعت پسیان
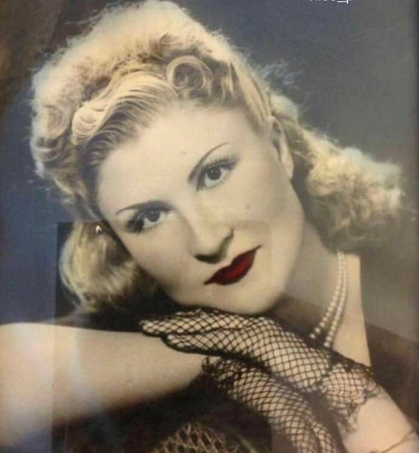
- Photograph of Mahtol'at Pessian
- Born: 1917
- Died: November 28, 1983 (aged 65–66)
- Occupations: Novelist, Playwright, Writer
- Spouse: Hossein-Gholi Mosta'an
- Children: Mahtab Mosta'an (daughter)

Mahtol'at Pessian (Persian: ماه‌طلعت پسیان; 1917 – 28 November 1983) was an Iranian novelist and playwright who named as Chief editor of Rahnama-ye Zendegi (1939–1940), Iran's first illustrated family magazine, which she published in collaboration with her husband. She is regarded as one of Iran's first female playwrights. She was second wife of Hossein-Gholi Mosta'an and mother of Mahtab Mosta'an.

== Sources ==
- Parvin, Nassereddin (2006). "RĀHNEMĀ-YE ZENDAGI". In Yarshater, Ehsan (ed.). Encyclopædia Iranica (Online ed.). Encyclopædia Iranica Foundation.
- Sharifianpour, Zarrin; Torabi Farsani, Soheila; Abtahi, Alireza. "سیمای زن مدرن از دیدگاه مجله راهنمای زندگی" [The Image of the Modern Woman in the Magazine Rahnamaye Zendegi]. نشریه تاریخ (Nashriye-ye Tarikh; History Journal) (in Persian) (47).
- Nazarzadeh, Rasoul (2020). زنان نمایشنامه‌نویس نسل اول و دوم [Women Playwrights of the First and Second Generations] (in Persian). Tehran: Afraz. ISBN 9786003264403.
